I cinque del quinto piano is an Italian sitcom.

Cast  
Gian Fabio Bosco as Edoardo
 Serena Cantalupi as Gisella 
Luca Sandri as Gianfilippo 
 Georgia D'Ambra as Stefania 
 Niccolò Della Bona as Simone 
 Guia Jelo as Rosalia 
 Giampiero Bianchi as Rastelli 
 Aldo Ralli as  Administrator 
 Felice Invernici as Daniele

See also
List of Italian television series

External links
 

Italian television series
Canale 5 original programming